Teys is a surname. Notable people with the surname include:

 Aaron Teys (born 1993), Australian bowler
 Brendan Teys (born 1990), Australian basketball player

See also
 Keys (surname)
 Tess (given name)
 Teys Australia, meat-processing company
 Teyss, river